Pasta Dioguardi is an Argentine film and TV actor.

He entered film in Las Aventuras de Dios in 2000 with a major role as the protagonist. Then in 2003 he appeared in the acclaimed film El Fondo del Mar working with Daniel Hendler.

Dioguardi has also appeared in the TV series Los Simuladores.

Filmography

External links
 
 

Year of birth missing (living people)
Living people
Argentine male film actors
Argentine male television actors
21st-century Argentine male actors